Oscar Berger (May 12, 1901 – May 15, 1997) was a well-known caricaturist and cartoonist.

Biography
Berger was born in Prešov, Slovakia. He became a cartoonist in Prague and studied art in Paris and Berlin.
In Berlin, he secured an assignment with one of the largest Berlin daily newspapers and was one of the few journalists admitted to the 1923 Munich trial that followed Hitler's abortive putsch.

Later, when Hitler came to power, Berger's cartoons angered Hitler and Berger was forced to leave the country. He spent time in Budapest, Paris, and Geneva, where he attended numerous sessions at the League of Nations.  He finally settled in London in 1935, where he worked for the Daily Telegraph. During the 1950s, Berger attended many sessions at the United Nations and illustrated virtually every important world leader to be seen there.

His work subsequently appeared in Life, the New York Times, the New York Herald Tribune and Le Figaro, among numerous other publications.

Oscar Berger's works were described by a contemporary as:

kindly rather than critical, mildly satirical but never vicious. They aim to entertain, to identify a sitter so unmistakably that a few telling lines will be telegraphed at a glance.

Some of Berger's books:

Aesop's Foibles (1947)
 a' la Carte - The Gourmet's Phantasmagoria in Fifty Cartoons (1948)
 Famous Faces - Caricaturist's Scrapbook (1950)
 My Victims - How to Caricature (1952)
 I Love You - A selection of love poetry (1960)
 The Presidents - From George Washington to the Present (1968)

Personal life
Berger married Aran (Anne) Varga, from Kispest, Hungary.  Anne and Oscar Berger emigrated to the U.S. from England and spent the rest of their lives on Central Park South in Manhattan.  Their niece, L.O. Aranye Fradenburg, is an English Professor at UC Santa Barbara. He is survived by cousins in NY through an aunt, Hermina Berger Tisch.

External links
 Official Website
 Cultural Contributions of Americans with Roots in Slovakia. The Visual Arts.

American editorial cartoonists
American caricaturists
American people of Slovak descent
1901 births
1997 deaths
Czechoslovak emigrants to the United States
Slovak caricaturists